Christopher J. Robinson (born May 12, 1984) is a Canadian former Major League Baseball (MLB) catcher who played for the San Diego Padres in 2013, and who also played internationally for the Canada national baseball team in the 2009 Baseball World Cup, the 2011 Pan American Games, and the 2013 World Baseball Classic.

Amateur career
Robinson attended Lord Dorchester Secondary School, where he was named Ontario Player of the Year in 2001. The New York Mets drafted Robinson out of high school in the 30th round (897th overall) of the 2002 Major League Baseball (MLB) Draft, but he did not sign, opting to enroll in college. Robinson enrolled at the University of Illinois at Urbana–Champaign, where he played college baseball for the Illinois Fighting Illini baseball team in the Big Ten Conference in the National Collegiate Athletic Association's Division I. At Illinois, Robinson was named the Big Ten Conference All-Star catcher in 2004 and 2005. In 2004, he played collegiate summer baseball with the Hyannis Mets of the Cape Cod Baseball League and was named a league all-star.

Professional career

Detroit Tigers
Out of Illinois, the Detroit Tigers drafted Robinson in the third round (90th overall) of the 2005 MLB draft. He was named the Tigers' best defensive catcher.

Chicago Cubs
In 2006, the Tigers traded Robinson to the Chicago Cubs for Neifi Pérez.

Texas Rangers
He signed as a minor league free agent with the Texas Rangers before the 2012 season, receiving an invitation to spring training. He was released on March 30.

Baltimore Orioles
On April 3, Robinson signed a minor league deal with the Baltimore Orioles and was assigned to the Triple-A Norfolk.

Robinson started the 2013 season with Norfolk.

San Diego Padres
He was traded to the San Diego Padres on June 20, and assigned to the Triple-A Tucson Padres. On August 15, 2013, Robinson had his contract selected by the Padres to replace Nick Hundley who had been placed on the paternity list. Robinson was optioned back to Tucson on August 17 without appearing in a game when Hundley returned. He was recalled on September 1 when rosters expanded. On September 25, Robinson hit a pinch-hit three-run home run in the eight inning to record both his first major league hit and home run. He was designated for assignment on September 30.

Robinson was presented with a special recognition award by the Major League Baseball Players Association at the Baseball Canada National Teams Award Banquet in January, 2014.

Retired
He retired from professional baseball in the 2014 off-season and became a full-time coach at Centerfield Sports and with the Great Lake Canadians in London, Ontario.

International career
Robinson has also competed for the Canadian national baseball team. Robinson played in the 2002 World Junior Baseball Championship, the 2003 Baseball World Cup, the 2006 World Baseball Classic, the 2009 Baseball World Cup, the 2011 Pan American Games, the 2013 World Baseball Classic and the 2015 Pan American Games.

References

External links

Minor League Baseball

1984 births
Living people
Baseball players at the 2008 Summer Olympics
Baseball players at the 2011 Pan American Games
Baseball players at the 2015 Pan American Games
Canadian expatriate baseball players in the United States
Daytona Cubs players
Hyannis Harbor Hawks players
Illinois Fighting Illini baseball players
Iowa Cubs players
Lakeland Tigers players
Major League Baseball catchers
Major League Baseball players from Canada
Norfolk Tides players
Olympic baseball players of Canada
Oneonta Tigers players
Pan American Games gold medalists for Canada
Pan American Games medalists in baseball
San Diego Padres players
Sportspeople from London, Ontario
Tennessee Smokies players
Tucson Padres players
West Michigan Whitecaps players
World Baseball Classic players of Canada
2006 World Baseball Classic players
2013 World Baseball Classic players
Medalists at the 2015 Pan American Games
Medalists at the 2011 Pan American Games